Ehud Yaari (born 1 March 1945) is an Israeli journalist, author, television personality and political commentator.

Biography
Ehud Ya'ari was born in 1945 during the Mandate era. He holds a BA in Middle Eastern Studies from the Hebrew University of Jerusalem, and an MA in Middle Eastern Studies from Tel Aviv University.

In 1968, he was an assistant to Shlomo Gazit, the Coordinator of Government Activities in the Territories. From 1969 to 1975, he was the Arab affairs correspondent for the newspaper Davar and Israel Army Radio. From 1975 to 2000, he was a commentator on Middle Eastern affairs on Channel 1. In 1987, he became a fellow at the Washington Institute for Near East Policy, and in 1990, he became a columnist for The Jerusalem Report. He became a commentator on Arab affairs on Channel 2 in 2000. In 2008, he joined the Adelson Institute for Strategic Studies of the Shalem Center.

Yaari has reported from Egypt and Lebanon, and in 1997, reported from Washington. He interviewed many Arab statesmen and leaders, and also conducted an interview with US President Bill Clinton. 

He was married to Hava Yaari, who worked as a foreign securities adviser at a bank, and they had a son and a daughter, Tzahi and Ephrat. In 1985 Hava and her friend, pharmacy owner Aviva Granot, embezzled funds from Mala Malavsky, a Jewish-American tourist and Holocaust survivor, and later murdered her by striking her over the head with a rolling pin and running her over with a car. Their trial was conducted amid heavy publicity and media attention, and was considered the most highly sensational murder case in Israel's history at the time. In 1987, they were convicted and sentenced to life imprisonment, but their sentences were later reduced for good behavior, and they were released in 2000. Ehud Yaari divorced his wife following her conviction.

His brother Yehuda Yaari is a journalist and lecturer at Ariel University. His son Tzahi gained attention in the Israeli media for his conversion to Christianity. In 2005, Tzahi was investigated for harassing Israeli news anchor Miki Haimovich. The case was dropped after he was deemed unfit to stand trial. Ehud later married Dagmar Strauss, who now goes by the name of Dagmar Strauss Yaari.

Media career
Ehud Yaari is an expert on Middle Eastern affairs. He is the author of eight books on the Arab-Israeli conflict,  some in collaboration with Ze'ev Schiff. He has interviewed  Yasser Arafat, King Hussein of Jordan and his son Abdullah, President Husni Mubarak of Egypt, almost all Israeli prime ministers since Menachem Begin (including Yitzhak Rabin), Bashar al-Assad, Bachir Gemayel, Muammar al-Gaddafi and others. Today, Ya'ari is a political commentator for Israel's Channel 2 news. Yaari is an associate editor of The Jerusalem Report and the Washington Institute for Near East Policy.  He is also Senior Fellow at the Adelson Institute for Strategic Studies. Ya'ari has published articles in The New York Times, The Wall Street Journal, The Washington Post, and Atlantic Monthly.

Awards
 Israeli Press Editors-in-Chief prize for coverage of the peace process with Egypt
 Sokolov Prize for coverage of the Lebanon War
 Israel Broadcasting Award for coverage of the Gulf War

Published works
 "Fatah" (Sabra Books, 1971)
 "Egypt's Policy Towards Israel in the Fifties" (1974)
 "A Guide to Egypt" (1982)
 "The Year of the Dove", co-authored with Ze'ev Schiff (Bantam, 1979)
 "Israel's Lebanon War" (Simon and Schuster, 1984)
 "Intifada", co-authored with Ze'ev Schiff (Simon and Schuster, 1990)
 "Toward Israeli-Palestinian Disengagement" and “Peace by Piece: A Decade of Egyptian Policy”.

See also
Television in Israel

References

External links
 Nasrallah’s Malaise - Jerusalem Report, October 2, 2006
 After the Palestinian Elections - JCPA
 Fight Delay- inside the Hamas Strategy - The New Republic
 Ehud Yaari on Adelson Institute for Strategic Studies
 Hamas Transformed January 2009
 Ehud Yaari in BICOM-Jewish News conference panel discussion - Trump and the Middle East: Prospects and Tasks, November 30 2016 

1945 births
Broadcast news analysts
Israeli journalists
Living people
Hebrew University of Jerusalem alumni
Tel Aviv University alumni